Horace Pittaway (born 20 March 1941) is a South African former cricketer. He played in fifteen first-class and four List A matches for Eastern Province between 1968/69 and 1972/73.

See also
 List of Eastern Province representative cricketers

References

External links
 

1941 births
Living people
South African cricketers
Eastern Province cricketers
People from Makhanda, Eastern Cape
Cricketers from the Eastern Cape